The landscape architecture firm of Frederick Law Olmsted, and later of his sons John Charles Olmsted and Frederick Law Olmsted Jr. (known as the Olmsted Brothers), produced designs and plans for hundreds of parks, campuses and other projects throughout the United States and Canada. Together, these works totaled 355. This is a non-exhaustive list of those projects.

Frederick Law Olmsted Sr.

Academic campuses
Frederick Law Olmsted Sr. designed numerous school and college campuses between 1857 and 1895. Some of the most famous done while he headed his firm are listed here.

 American University Main Campus, Washington, D.C.
 Berwick Academy, South Berwick, Maine (1894)
 Bryn Mawr College, Bryn Mawr, Pennsylvania (1885)
 Cornell University, Ithaca, New York (1867–1873)
 Fairleigh Dickinson University, Madison, New Jersey
 Gallaudet University, Washington, D.C. (1866)
 Groton School, Groton, Massachusetts
 Lawrenceville School, Lawrenceville, New Jersey (1883–1901)
 Manhattanville College, Purchase, New York
 Mount Holyoke College, South Hadley, Massachusetts
 Noble and Greenough School, Dedham, Massachusetts
 Phillips Academy, Andover, Massachusetts (1891–1965)
 Pomfret School, Pomfret, Connecticut
 St. Albans School (Washington, D.C.)
 Smith College, Northampton, Massachusetts (1891–1909)
 Stanford University, Palo Alto, California, Main Quad (1887–1906) and campus master plan (1886–1914)
 Trinity College, Hartford, Connecticut (1872–1894)
 University of California, Berkeley, Berkeley, California, master plan (1865)
 University of Chicago, Chicago, Illinois
 University of Maine, Orono, Maine
 University of Rochester, Rochester, New York
 Washington University in St. Louis, St. Louis, Missouri (1865–1899)
 Wellesley College, Wellesley, Massachusetts
 Yale University, New Haven, Connecticut (1874–1881)

Selected private and civic designs
By Frederick Law Olmsted, Sr.:

Olmsted Brothers
After the retirement of Frederick Law Olmsted Sr in 1895, the firm was managed by John Charles Olmsted and Frederick Law Olmsted Jr., as Olmsted and Olmsted, Olmsted Olmsted and Eliot, and Olmsted Brothers. Works from this period, which spanned from 1895 to 1950, are often misattributed to Frederick Sr. They include:

Academic campuses
Alabama A&M University, Normal, Alabama 
Bryn Mawr College, Bryn Mawr, Pennsylvania (1895–1927)
Chatham University, Pittsburgh, Pennsylvania
Denison University, Granville, Ohio (1916)
Eastern Kentucky University, Richmond, Kentucky
Fisk University, Nashville, Tennessee (1929-1933)
Florence State Teachers College, Florence, Alabama (University of North Alabama) 
Grove City College, Grove City, Pennsylvania (1929)
Harvard Business School, Allston, Massachusetts (1925–1931)
Haverford College, Haverford, Pennsylvania (1925–1932)*
Huntingdon College campus, Montgomery, Alabama
Indiana University, Bloomington, Indiana (1929–1936) 
Iowa State University Ames, Iowa (1906)
Johns Hopkins University, Baltimore, Maryland (1903–1919)
Lafayette College, Easton, Pennsylvania (1909)
Lincoln Institute, Lincoln Ridge, Kentucky (1911)
Louisiana State University, Baton Rouge, Louisiana
Morehead State University, Morehead, Kentucky (1923)
Middlesex School, Concord, Massachusetts (1901)
Mount Holyoke College, South Hadley, Massachusetts (1896–1922)
Newton Country Day School, Newton, Massachusetts (1927)
Oberlin College, Oberlin, Ohio (1903) 
Ohio State University, Columbus, Ohio (1909)
Oregon State University, Corvallis, Oregon (1909) 
Roslyn High School, Roslyn, New York (1920s)
Saint Joseph College, West Hartford, Connecticut
Samford University, Homewood, Alabama
Stanford University, Stanford, California (1886–1914)
Troy University, Troy, Alabama
Tufts University, Medford, Massachusetts (1920)
University of Chicago, Chicago, Illinois (1901–1910)
University of Florida, Gainesville, Florida (1925)
University of Idaho, Moscow, Idaho (1908)
University of Montevallo, Montevallo, Alabama
University of Maine, Orono, Maine (1932)
University of Notre Dame, Notre Dame, Indiana (1929–1932)
University of Rhode Island, Kingston, Rhode Island (1894–1903)
University of Washington, Seattle, Washington (1902–1920)
Vassar College, Poughkeepsie, New York (1896–1932)
Western Michigan University Main Campus, Kalamazoo, Michigan (1904)
Williams College, Williamstown, Massachusetts (1902–1912)

Selected private and civic designs
By Olmsted and Olmsted, Olmsted Olmsted and Eliot, and Olmsted Brothers:

Adair Country Inn gardens, Bethlehem, New Hampshire
Audubon Park, New Orleans, Louisiana
Ashland Park, residential neighborhood built around Ashland, The Henry Clay Estate in Lexington, Kentucky
Bloomfield, Villanova, PA. Private house of George McFadden.
 Branch Brook Park, Newark, New Jersey
The British Properties, Vancouver, British Columbia, Canada
Brookdale Park, Bloomfield & Montclair, New Jersey
Cambridge American Cemetery and Memorial a memorial for American World War II servicemen in Cambridgeshire, near Cambridge, England
Caracas Country Club (1928), Alta Florida, Capital District, Caracas, Venezuela
Carroll Park, Baltimore, Maryland
Cedar Brook Park, Shakespeare Garden, Plainfield, New Jersey
Cleveland Metroparks System, in the Greater Cleveland area, Ohio
Crocker Field, Fitchburg, Massachusetts
Deering Oaks, Portland, Maine
The Gardens at Dey Mansion Washington's Headquarters, Wayne,New Jersey
Druid Hills, Atlanta, Georgia
Dunn Gardens, Seattle, Washington
Eastern Promenade, Portland, Maine
Elm Bank Horticulture Center, Wellesley, Massachusetts
Fairmont Park, Riverside, California
First Presbyterian Church of Far Rockaway, Queens, New York
Fort Tryon Park, New York City
Franklin Delano Roosevelt Park, Philadelphia, Pennsylvania (originally League Island Park)
Fresh Pond, Cambridge, Massachusetts
Garret Mountain Reservation, Woodland Park, New Jersey
Goffle Brook Park, Hawthorne, New Jersey
Grover Cleveland Park, Caldwell, New Jersey
Hermann Dudley Murphy House, Lexington, Massachusetts
High Point Park, Montague, New Jersey
High Rock Reservation, a park in Lynn, Massachusetts
Homelands Neighborhood, Springfield, Massachusetts
"New" Katonah, Katonah, New York
Kentucky State Capitol Grounds, Frankfort, Kentucky
Kohler (Village of), Wisconsin
Leimert Park Neighborhood, Los Angeles
Locust Valley Cemetery, Locust Valley, New York
Metro Parks, Summit County, Ohio
Manito Park and Botanical Gardens, Spokane, Washington
Marconi Plaza (originally Oregon Plaza)
Marquette Park, Chicago, Illinois
Memorial Park (Jacksonville), Florida
Memorial Park, Maplewood, New Jersey
Mill Creek Park, Youngstown, Ohio
North Park, Fall River, Massachusetts, 1901
Otto Kahn Estate, Cold Spring Hills, New York
Oldfields-Lilly House and Gardens, a National Historic Landmark, originally Hugh Landon estate (Olmsted job # 6883  1920–1927) , Indianapolis, Indiana
Passaic County Parks System 
Piedmont Park, Atlanta, Georgia
Planting Fields, Oyster Bay, Long Island, New York
Pope Park (Hartford, Connecticut)
The Portland park plan, Portland, Oregon
Preakness Valley Park,  Wayne, New Jersey
Prouty Garden, Boston Children's Hospital, Boston This garden is at risk of being destroyed for redevelopment purposes.
 Pulaski Park, Holyoke, Massachusetts
Rahway River Parkway Union County, New Jersey
Riverside Park, Hartford, Connecticut
Rancho Los Alamitos Gardens, Long Beach, California
Riverbend, Walter J. Kohler, Sr. estate grounds, Kohler, Wisconsin
Seattle Park System
Southern Boulevard Parkway (Philadelphia, Pennsylvania)
South Mountain Reservation, Maplewood, Millburn, South Orange, West Orange, New Jersey
South Park (now Kennedy Park), Fall River, Massachusetts, 1904
Spokane, Washington city parks
 Springdale Park, Holyoke, Massachusetts
Thompson Park and roadways, Watertown, New York
Union County, New Jersey park system
Utica, New York Parks and Parkway System (1908–1914)
Verona Park, Verona, New Jersey
Wade Lagoon, on University Circle, Cleveland
The garden at Welwyn Preserve, Long Island, New York
Warinanco Park, Roselle, New Jersey
Washington State Capitol campus, Olympia, Washington
Watsessing Park, Bloomfield, New Jersey
Weasel Brook Park,  Clifton, New Jersey 
Weequahic Park, Weequahic section of Newark, New Jersey
The Highlands Neighborhood, Seattle
Barberrys, Nelson Doubleday house, Mill Neck, New York (1919–1924)
"Allgates," Horatio Gates Lloyd house, Coopertown Road, Haverford, Pennsylvania (1911–1915)

References

Olmsted